Package delivery or parcel delivery is the delivery of shipping containers, parcels, or high value mail as single shipments. The service is provided by most postal systems, express mail, private courier companies, and less than truckload shipping carriers.

Mail order and next-day delivery in the United Kingdom
Welsh entrepreneur Pryce Pryce-Jones formed the first mail order company in 1861. He distributed catalogues of Welsh flannel across the United Kingdom, with customers able to order by mail for the first time—this following the Uniform Penny Post in 1840 and the invention of the postage stamp (Penny Black) where there was a charge of one penny for carriage and delivery between any two places in the United Kingdom irrespective of distance—and the goods were delivered throughout the UK via the newly created railway system. Price-Jones promised next-day delivery throughout much of the country.

Package delivery in the United States
In 1852 Wells Fargo, then just one of many such services, was formed to provide both banking and express services. These went hand-in-hand, as the handling of California gold and other financial matters required a secure method for transporting them across the country. This put Wells Fargo securely in the stagecoach business and prompted them to participate in the Pony Express venture. They were preceded, among others, by the Butterfield Overland Stage, but the failure of the latter put the business in Wells Fargo's hands and led to a monopoly on overland traffic that lasted until 1869 when the transcontinental rail line was completed. During this period they carried regular mail in addition to the package business, defying the post office monopoly; eventually, a compromise was worked out wherein Wells Fargo charged its own fee on top of federal postage, in recognition of the limitations of the post office reaching all areas easily.

From 1869 on, package services rapidly moved to the rail, which was faster and cheaper. The express office was a universal feature of the staffed railroad station. Packages travelled as "head-end" traffic in passenger trains. In 1918 the formation of the United States Railroad Administration resulted in a consolidation of all such services into a single agency, which after the war continued as the Railway Express Agency (REA).

On 1 January 1913, parcel post service began, providing rural postal customers with package service along with their regular mail and obviating a trip to a town substantial enough to support an express office. This, along with Rural Free Delivery, fueled a huge rise in catalogue sales. By this time the post office monopoly on mail was effectively enforced, and Wells Fargo had exited the business in favour of its banking enterprises.

Motor freight services arose quickly with the advent of gasoline and diesel-powered trucks. United Parcel Service had its origins in this era, initially as a private courier service. The general improvement of the highway system following World War II prompted its expansion into a nationwide service, and other similar services arose. At the same time, the contraction of rail passenger service hurt rail-based package shipping; these contractions led to the cancellation of the mail contracts with the railroads, which in turn caused further passenger cuts. Eventually, REA was dissolved in bankruptcy in 1975.

Air mail was conceived of early, and scheduled service began in 1918. Scheduled airlines carried high valued and perishable goods from early on. The most important advance, however, came with the "hub and spoke" system pioneered by Federal Express (now known as FedEx) in 1973. With deregulation in 1977, they were able to establish an air-based system capable of delivering small packages—including mail—overnight throughout most of the country. In response, the postal service initiated a comparable Express Mail service. In the same period, they also began contracting with Amtrak to carry mail by rail. Thus at the beginning of the 21st century, the U.S. consumer can choose from a variety of public and private services offering deliveries at various combinations of speed and cost.

By 2018, parcel carriers are hauling 14% of U.S. goods, up from 10% 25 years ago, and FedEx’s US domestic volume increased 4.9% in 2018, while UPS reported a 3.3% increase and a 5.6% increase in domestic next-day air package.

Same-day delivery
Same-day delivery for local parcels (such as documents) has long been available by local courier. Rail and air transport made same-day delivery feasible over longer distances; for example, packages shipped in the early morning can be delivered (at relatively high cost) anywhere in the mainland United States. Retail goods were seldom sold with shipping any faster than overnight.

Some online grocers such as AmazonFresh and Webvan, and delivery services operated by grocery stores like Peapod and Safeway have had same-day or next-day delivery windows. Many restaurants have long delivered takeout locally on-demand, and online food ordering services have expanded this to many restaurants that would otherwise not deliver.

In the 2010s, various experimental services launched, using online shopping and retail warehouses or chain stores local to the ordering consumer for fulfillment at relatively low cost. The United States Postal Service "Metro Post" started in 2012, which by 2014 was shipping Amazon orders to 15 cities. In 2013, Walmart was delivering same-day packages from its own stores in test cities via UPS.

Kozmo.com started a general one-hour local delivery service for small items in 1998, but failed in 2001. Same-day retail service Postmates began in 2011, and Google Express began in 2013 with a limited number of vendors and cities. By September 2015, Amazon Prime Now (which includes selected goods including some groceries) offered 1-hour delivery in 13 cities,
and the company launched Amazon Flex, which is a service similar to Postmates using part-time workers to deliver Amazon Prime Now packages.

Some vehicle for hire companies offer courier service and delivery of items ordered online from local vendors. Startups with similar services include Doorman in San Francisco, Chicago, and New York City, Deliv in San Francisco, WeDeliver in Chicago, and Shutl in Manhattan and Chicago.

An alternative to same-day delivery is in-store pickup, which has been adopted even by previously online-only retailers like Amazon.

Regional parcel carriers

In addition, a number of regional parcel delivery companies have sprung up since the 1990s. They combine the track and trace capability of the national carriers with the ability to guarantee next day delivery at ground rates over a larger delivery footprint. Because they are regionally based, they are able to improve shipment time in transit and increase shippers productivity with later pick up times. The regional parcel carriers can be a cost-effective enhancement to UPS and FedEx because they do not charge the full array of accessorial charges mentioned in the section above.

Heavy goods delivery
Delivery of heavy goods, such as furniture or large appliances, requires a different logistical process than most small parcel couriers. For example, the supply chain of shipping large household goods from their manufacturers, to residential or business locations throughout the country and world is more complex and carries with it a higher potential for damage and error than with smaller packages.

Specialized less than truckload shipping carriers handle shipping furniture and other heavy goods from the manufacturer to a last mile hub." The last mile problem can also include the challenge of making deliveries in urban areas. Deliveries to retail stores, restaurants, and other merchants in a central business district often contribute to congestion and safety problems. Once the goods arrive at the last mile hub, which is typically located less than 200 miles from the final delivery location, a dedicated last-mile carrier, also known as a white glove delivery company, will handle the final leg of the delivery.

White glove refers to the highest service level for last-mile delivery of heavy goods. It involves the delivery team bringing the item to the room of choice, unpacking and assembling it, and removing all packaging and debris from the customer's home. There are over 4,000 white glove delivery companies in the United States, most of which only perform local deliveries. Some large less-than-truckload shipping carriers also offer white glove delivery service, and in recent years start-ups have emerged that offer nationwide networks of white glove delivery coverage. With the growth of E-commerce websites that sell heavy goods throughout the country and world the white glove delivery marketplace is shifting from mostly regional carriers working with local brick and mortar stores to E-commerce websites working with national delivery networks.

Package design for distribution

The individual sorting and handling systems of small parcel carriers can put severe stress on the packages and contents. Packaging needs to be designed for the potential hazards which may be encountered in parcel delivery systems. The major carriers have a packaging engineering staff which provides packaging guidelines and sometimes package design and package testing services.
  Many e-retailers have specific packaging requirements for their suppliers and also offer assistance in package design. 

When shopping retail order from a warehouse, such as for online shopping, multiple items are often placed in a single box (secondary packaging) for cheaper and easier transportation and tracking. This creates waste when there is only a single item that could be transported without an outer box (for example something that already has durable retail primary packaging). To avoid this problem, some items are designated in the industry as ships in own container (SIOC) and will receive only a shipping label. Some products are specifically designed as SIOC for environmental or cost reasons.

Package testing procedures include:
ASTM International  D7386- Standard Practice for Performance Testing of Packages for Single Parcel Delivery Systems.

International Safe Transit Association
Project 3K: Fast Moving Consumer Goods for the European Retail Supply Chain
6-FEDEX-A: FedEx Procedures for Testing Packaged Products Weighing Up to 150 lbs
6-FEDEX-B: FedEx Procedures for Testing Packaged Products Weighing Over 150 lbs
6-SAMSCLUB, Packaged-Products for Sam’s Club® Distribution System Shipment
Procedure 7D: Thermal Controlled Transport Packaging for Parcel Delivery System Shipment

Recipients

Recipients, if they are to receive packages in a timely and appropriate manner, must accommodate carriers. With the rise of the sharing economy multiple family dwelling with restricted access face difficulties due to increasing volume of deliveries, some of which, such as food, may be time-sensitive. Some have built storage rooms for packages and installed refrigerators.

Recipients often choose to use a high capacity “parcel box” which will store large numbers of items and mail at the same time. Deposited items are securely stored with the use of internal security baffles which allow parcels to drop down into the lower portions of the box whilst restricting the theft of items through the aperture opening.

Temperature considerations

Prolonged extreme temperature exposure is an important consideration for delivery of some types of products. Many delivery vans are not controlled for temperature: Delivered items may sit unattended for hours on porches, on driveways, or in mail boxes.   

Potential heat exposure may cause degradation to some pharmaceuticals, live plants, foods, paint, cut flowers, chemicals, etc. Packages sitting on hot pavement or in the direct sun can become very hot.  Sunlight on enclosed mail boxes can amplify the ambient temperature.   For example, the USFDA found that the temperature in a steel mailbox painted black could reach 136 °F (58 °C) in full sun while the ambient air temperature was 101 °F (38 °C).

Similarly, extreme cold temperature can damage or degrade other types of products.  

Several options may help.  Insulated shipping containers, thermal bags, or special mailing envelopes are sometimes used.  Some carriers offer express delivery or “special handling”.  Consignees may be required to personally accept delivery to prevent unattended drop-offs.   Temperature data loggers, analog devices, and  thermochromic inks are available to help identify temperature abuse.

See also
Shipping list
Document automation
Mail carrier
Last mile (transportation)
Package pilferage
Package theft
Parcel post
Delivery drone
Autonomous car

References

Further reading
A Brief History of the Package Delivery Industry, United States Treasury

Postal systems
Express mail
Packaging